Satan Town is a 1926 American silent Western film featuring Harry Carey. Prints of the film have survived.

Cast
 Harry Carey as Bill Scott
 Kathleen Collins as Sue
 Charles Clary as John Jerome
 Trilby Clark as Sheila Jerome
 Richard Neill as Cherokee Charlie
 Ben Hall as Crippy Jack
 Charles Delaney as Frisco Bob
 Ben Hendricks Sr. as Malamute (as Ben Hendricks)

See also
 Harry Carey filmography

References

External links

 

1926 films
1926 Western (genre) films
American black-and-white films
Films directed by Edmund Mortimer
Pathé Exchange films
Silent American Western (genre) films
1920s American films